In number theory, the Kempner function  is defined for a given positive integer  to be the smallest number  such that  divides the  For example, the number  does not divide , ,  but does  

This function has the property that it has a highly inconsistent growth rate: it grows linearly on the prime numbers but only grows sublogarithmically at the factorial numbers.

History
This function was first considered by François Édouard Anatole Lucas in 1883, followed by Joseph Jean Baptiste Neuberg in 1887. In 1918, A. J. Kempner gave the first correct algorithm for 

The Kempner function is also sometimes called the Smarandache function following Florentin Smarandache's rediscovery of the function

Properties

 is the smallest possible degree of a monic polynomial with integer coefficients, whose values over the integers are all divisible 
For instance, the fact that  means that there is a cubic polynomial whose values are all zero modulo 6, for instance the polynomial

but that all quadratic or linear polynomials (with leading coefficient one) are nonzero modulo 6 at some integers.

Computational complexity
When  is itself a prime power , its Kempner function may be found in polynomial time by sequentially scanning the multiples of  until finding the first one whose factorial contains enough multiples  The same algorithm can be extended to any  whose prime factorization is already known, by applying it separately to each prime power in the factorization and choosing the one that leads to the largest value.

It follows from this that computing the Kempner function of a semiprime (a product of two primes) is computationally equivalent to finding its prime factorization, believed to be a difficult problem. More generally, whenever  is a composite number, the greatest common divisor of   will necessarily be a nontrivial divisor  allowing  to be factored by repeated evaluations of the Kempner function. Therefore, computing the Kempner function can in general be no easier than factoring composite numbers.

References and notes

Factorial and binomial topics